Stidia is a small town and commune in Hassi Mamèche District, Mostaganem Province, Algeria. In 1998 the commune had a total population of 10,688.

Situation

A four-lane highway links both cities, via Stidia. The city is located on the Greenwich meridian.

Name
The name of Stidia derives from an old fountain named Aïn Stidia. The town was first named La Stidia, before being renamed Georges Clémenceau by the French, after World War I.

According to Salim Ammar who was born in the territory of Stidia, this town was named in the 15th century by the Moors Istija (إستجة) in honor of their lost city in Andalucia, the current Écija. The German settlers later in the 19th century mispronounced the Arabic name and it became Stidia or Stidya.

History

Before the foundation of the European settlement down the hill, the Moors who were expelled from Spain after 1492, founded the original Stidia on the hill and it is called now "Douar" Stidia to differentiate it from " Village" Stidia which is the part built during the French occupation.
The moorish influence is obvious in the territory of Stidia and Fornaka. The ethnic groups living in the territory keep the remembrance of the epic History of the fighting against the Spanish crusades.

Although the fountain Aïn Stidia existed for some time, the town was founded in 1846, by German settlers who tried to emigrate to South America, but were directed to Algeria, after being abandoned in Dunkerque, France by a dishonest conveyor.
The settlement was first helped by French soldiers who left in 1948. Although Algeria was a French colony at the time, the inhabitants continued to speak German until about the first World War.
At the independence of Algeria (1962), the town was renamed Stidia (from Georges Clémenceau).

Demographics

 1866 : 486
 1958 : 1.301
 2002 : 11.500

Attractions

Beaches
The beaches in the Stidia region attract many tourists (mainly Algerians from Mostaganem and surroundings) during the summer. Although not the best ones of the western Algerian coast, they still offer good recreation opportunities. There is often a guarded parking (for a small fee) in front of the beach. The nearest accommodation is in Mostaganem (15 km), or, to a greater extent, in Oran (65 km). There are no hotels in Stidia.

Greenwich meridian
A plate indicates the crossing of the Greenwich meridian, on the Mostaganem-Oran highway.

References

Communes of Mostaganem Province
Cities in Algeria
Algeria